Brian Benjamin Shefton, FBA, FSA (11 August 1919 – 25 January 2012), born Bruno Benjamin Scheftelowitz, was a German-born British classical archaeologist.

He was the founder of the Shefton Museum, which bore his name.

References 

  

1919 births
2012 deaths
Classical archaeologists
British archaeologists
German emigrants to the United Kingdom
Place of birth missing
Fellows of the British Academy
Fellows of the Society of Antiquaries of London